East Lake is a census-designated place (CDP) in Pinellas County, Florida, United States. The population was 30,962 at the 2010 census. It was one of the last areas in the densely populated county to develop.  It is often confused with East Lake in neighboring Hillsborough County.

Description 
East Lake is a Census area that consists of the separate sub-communities of East Lake Woodlands, Lansbrook, Ridgemoor, Woodfield, Boot Ranch, and Tarpon Woods. Its boundaries include Pasco County to the north, Hillsborough County to the east, the city of Oldsmar to the south, and Palm Harbor and the city of Tarpon Springs to the west. It is represented in the U.S. House of representatives by Gus Bilirakis.

The area is popular with families due to the quality of East Lake High School which has managed to rate equivalently with Palm Harbor's University High School (both A+ rated), despite not having the attraction of an International Baccalaureate program like Palm Harbor University High. Also of benefit are the top-flight youth recreational programs offered by East Lake/City of Oldsmar.

Geography 
East Lake is located at  (28.099957, -82.697220). The unincorporated community is located just north of Oldsmar and east of Palm Harbor and Tarpon Springs.

The closest beach is Honeymoon Island State Park. The closest county park is John Chesnut Sr. County Park. It covers approximately  adjacent to Lake Tarpon.

Schools 
East Lake High School has managed to rate equivalently with Palm Harbor's University High School (both A+ rated), despite not having the attraction of an International Baccalaureate program like Palm Harbor University High. Also of benefit are the top-flight youth recreational programs offered by East Lake/City of Oldsmar.

Public Library 
The East Lake Community Library is the public library that services the East Lake and greater Pinellas County area. It is a member of the Pinellas Public Library Cooperative. The library itself is a result of community initiative which resulted in the ELCL opening a physical building November 1, 1999. 

In 2013 the ELCL "became an independent library with its own taxing district, thereby providing a new revenue stream for operational expenses and enhancements to the building. This also resulted in an increase in hours, staffing, programs, services, and collections."

The library’s outdoor space is designated as a Florida Butterfly Garden. As of January 2015, the library has established a special collection area for local, self-published authors to submit their works for circulation and display.

In 2016 Governor Rick Scott passed the Florida State Budget granting the ELCL a $1,000,000 in funding for expansion of the library. 
On November 20th, 2017, the library broke ground on the phase 1 of the expansion which aimed to expand the library by 2,600 square feet.

Demographics 
As of the census of 2000, there were 29,394 people, 11,854 households, and 8,914 families residing in the CDP.  The population density was 381.1/km2 (987.0/mi2).  There were 13,339 housing units at an average density of 172.9/km2 (447.9/mi2).  The racial makeup of the CDP was 94.87% White, 1.11% African American, 0.14% Native American, 2.31% Asian, 0.01% Pacific Islander, 0.58% from other races, and 0.98% from two or more races. Hispanic or Latino of any race were 3.72% of the population.

There were 11,854 households, out of which 31.8% had children under the age of 18 living with them, 67.1% were married couples living together, 6.2% had a female householder with no husband present, and 24.8% were non-families. 20.8% of all households were made up of individuals, and 8.2% had someone living alone who was 65 years of age or older.  The average household size was 2.48 and the average family size was 2.88.

In the CDP, the population was spread out, with 23.8% under the age of 18, 4.3% from 18 to 24, 26.2% from 25 to 44, 27.8% from 45 to 64, and 17.9% who were 65 years of age or older.  The median age was 43 years.  For every 100 females there were 94.7 males.  For every 100 females age 18 and over, there were 90.4 males.

The median income for a household in the CDP was $67,546, and the median income for a family was $79,029.  Males had a median income of $61,625 versus $32,289 for females.  The per capita income for the CDP was $36,206.  About 3.1% of families and 3.9% of the population were below the poverty line, including 4.5% of those under age 18 and 3.9% of those age 65 or over.

References

External links
 East Lake Community Library
 Postal conflicts between the two East Lakes in Pinellas and Hillsborough counties

Unincorporated communities in Pinellas County, Florida
Census-designated places in Pinellas County, Florida
Census-designated places in Florida
Unincorporated communities in Florida